The  Washington Redskins season was the franchise's 71st season in the National Football League, and their 66th representing Washington, D.C.. They failed to improve on their 8–8 record from 2001, finishing at 7–9. For cornerback Darrell Green, this was his 20th and final season with the team.

Offseason

NFL Draft

Undrafted free agents

Personnel

Staff

Roster

Regular season

Schedule

Game summaries

Week 1 vs. Arizona Cardinals
The Redskins hosted their now-former division foe in the Cardinals’ first season in the revamped NFC West.  In Steve Spurrier’s debut as Skins coach his “Fun & Gun” offense put up 442 yards in a 31–23 win.  Shane Matthews erupted to three touchdowns while Jake Plummer of the Cardinals was held to just fourteen completions.

Monday Night Football vs. Philadelphia Eagles
Spurrier's “Fun & Gun” was hammered 37-7 as Matthews completed just ten passes and Danny Wuerffel was sacked four times.  At one point the exasperated Spurrier was caught on ABC cameras flapping his gums, a scene replayed in slow motion.

Week 7: at Green Bay Packers

Standings

References

Washington
Washington Redskins seasons
Red